Jumbo is a 2020 drama film written and directed by Zoé Wittock in her feature directorial debut. An international co-production of France, Belgium and Luxembourg, the film stars Noémie Merlant, Emmanuelle Bercot, Bastien Bouillon and Sam Louwyck.

It had its world premiere at the Sundance Film Festival on 24 January 2020. It was released in Belgium on 18 March 2020, by O'Brother Distribution, and was released in France on 1 July 2020, by Rezo Films. At the 11th Magritte Awards, Jumbo was nominated for two awards, including Best First Feature Film.

Plot
Jeanne Tantois is a girl who is fascinated with carousels. She lives at home alone with her mother, and works in an amusement park. One day at her work, Jeanne falls in love with the park’s new attraction, a ride called Jumbo.

Cast
 Noémie Merlant as Jeanne Tantois
 Emmanuelle Bercot as Margarette
 Bastien Bouillon as Marc
 Sam Louwyck as Hubert

Production
In February 2018, it was announced Noémie Merlant and Emmanuelle Bercot had joined the cast of the film, with Zoé Wittock directing from a screenplay she wrote, with Rezo Films distributing the film in France.

Release
The film had its world premiere at the Sundance Film Festival on 24 January 2020. It also screened at the Berlin International Film Festival on 26 February 2020. The film was released in Belgium on 18 March 2020, through video on demand, after previously being set for a theatrical release, which was scrapped due to the COVID-19 pandemic. Shortly after, Dark Star Pictures acquired U.S. distribution rights to the film. It is scheduled to be released in France on 1 July 2020. It was previously set to be released on 18 March 2020.

Critical reception
The site's critical consensus reads, "Jumbo might be more compelling as an idea than a complete viewing experience, but whatever this strikingly unusual love story lacks in narrative finesse, it makes up in originality." On Metacritic, the film holds a rating of 54 out of 100, based on 7 critics, indicating "mixed or average reviews".

See also
 Object sexuality

References

External links
 
 
 

2020 films
French drama films
Belgian drama films
Luxembourgian drama films
Films set in amusement parks
Films not released in theaters due to the COVID-19 pandemic
2020s French-language films
French-language Belgian films
2020s French films